PP-4 Attock-IV is a Constituency of Provincial Assembly of Punjab.

Pakistan General Election 2018 
In 2018 Pakistani general election, Malik Muhammad Nawaz a ticket holder of PTI won PP-4 Attock IV election by taking 49,589 votes.

General elections 2013

General elections 2008

See also
 PP-3 Attock-III
 PP-5 Attock-V

References

External links
 Election commission Pakistan's official website
 Awazoday.com check result
 Official Website of Government of Punjab

Provincial constituencies of Punjab, Pakistan